Transport University may refer to:
St. Petersburg State Transport University
Omsk State Transport University
Siberian State Transport University
Belarusian State University of Transport

See also
Jiaotong University (disambiguation), literally Transport University